The 11th TCA Awards were presented by the Television Critics Association in a ceremony hosted by Friends co-stars Jennifer Aniston and Matt LeBlanc. The ceremony was held on July 21, 1995, at the Ritz-Carlton Huntington Hotel and Spa in Pasadena, Calif.

Winners and nominees

Multiple wins 
The following shows received multiple wins:

Multiple nominations 
The following shows received multiple nominations:

References

External links
Official website 
1995 TCA Awards at IMDb.com

1995 television awards
1995 in American television
TCA Awards ceremonies